is a song by Japanese singer Showta, released as his 3rd single on April 4, 2007.

Background and release

"Hito Shizuku" is a mid-tempo ballad composed by Hideya Nakazaki, with lyrics written by Taiyo Morito and Juli Shono. The single was released on April 4, 2007 under the King Records, along with "Reality", the B-side.

Reception
"Hito Shizuku" reached #31 on the Oricon Weekly Singles Chart and charted for 3 weeks. CDJournal described "Hito Shizuku" as healing and mentioned that Showta's androgynous voice and appearance had a mysterious charm. Barks described "Hito Shizuku" as having an "Asian taste" that will "touch the heart of any Japanese person", with Showta's vocals likely to "heal" both physically and emotionally. The music video was also praised for being masculine and mature compared to his debut.

Track listing

Charts

References

2007 singles
2007 songs
Japanese-language songs